is a licensing company owned by manga artist Go Nagai. It was established in 1974 as a sister company of Dynamic Productions.

Dynamic Planning is credited in all of Go Nagai's animated works since 1974 as the "planner" and/or "producer".

Since the '70s, Toei exported their anime collaborations with Dynamic Planning without their permission (Go Nagai was unaware of that fact) to Europe, Asia and America. Mazinger Z is extremely popular in Spain, Latin America and throughout Asia: UFO Robot Grendizer (aka Goldorak and Goldrake between 1976 and 1980 was a huge hit in Italy and France; Groizer X (aka O Pirata do Espaço ) was a '80s hit in Brasil. The popular Super Robot Wars's console game features most of Dynamic Planning's giant robot characters. 

In 1994 Dynamic Planning established an International Division, directed by Go Nagai's brother Kenji Nagai (永井謙次) and Federico Colpi, which soon established a network of associated companies throughout Europe and Asia called The Dynamic Group of Companies.

In March 2001, the International Division was incorporated as d/world, a joint-venture between Dynamic Planning and Marubeni's subsidiary Omega Project. Following Marubeni's exit from the anime business in 2001, d/world was liquidated.

The 2014 anime television series Robot Girls Z is based on Super Robots by Dynamic Planning.

References

External links

Mass media companies of Japan
Anime companies
Mass media companies established in 1974
1974 establishments in Japan